Jacobus du Toit (born 8 September 1959) is a South African former cricketer. He played in 73 first-class and 46 List A matches from 1975/76 to 1991/92.

References

External links
 

1959 births
Living people
South African cricketers
Boland cricketers
Gauteng cricketers
Northerns cricketers
Western Province cricketers
People from Worcester, South Africa
Cricketers from the Western Cape